Wingo Branch is a stream in the U.S. state of Mississippi.

Wingo is a name possibly corrupted from the Choctaw language meaning "chief".

References

Rivers of Mississippi
Rivers of Tippah County, Mississippi
Mississippi placenames of Native American origin